Roads and Maritime Services (also known as Roads & Maritime Services) was an agency of the New South Wales Government responsible for building and maintaining road infrastructure and managing the day-to-day compliance and safety for roads and waterways.

The agency was created on 1 November 2011 from a merger of the Roads & Traffic Authority and NSW Maritime. Planning responsibilities were transferred to Transport for NSW, which was created on the same day. In April 2019, it was announced that the agency was to have all its functions transferred to Transport for NSW. Legislation was passed in the NSW Parliament in November 2019, and it was dissolved on 1 December 2019.

Functions

Vehicle registration

Roads and Maritime Services was responsible for the registration of vehicles (including the issuing of registration plates) and the issuing of driver licences in New South Wales, boat/PWC(personal watercraft) licences, including testing and administering of licences. Additionally, RMS produced photo cards for identification of non-drivers and issues photographic firearms licences and security licences for the New South Wales Police Firearms Registry, Commercial Agents and Private Inquiry Agents cards and Mobility Parking Permits. All cards issued by RMS were physically printed by the card division in Parkes, New South Wales.

Major incident response

Within NSW, the Transport Management Centre is responsible for managing special events and unplanned incidents and disseminating information to motorists. It is the central point for identifying and directing the response to incidents such as crashes, breakdowns and spills. It passes on information to the public through the media, the RMS call centre and variable message signs along routes.

In 1999 the NSW Transport Management Centre (TMC) established Traffic Commander and Traffic Emergency Patrol (TEP) services throughout the Greater Urban Area of Sydney to provide 24-hour 365-day-a-year coverage to "Manage the traffic arrangements around an incident scene and return the road to normal operating conditions with the utmost urgency."

Traffic Commanders take command of traffic management arrangements at an incident (such as a motor vehicle collision) and liaise with other response agencies such as the Police, and assist in clearing the road and minimising the effects and disruption to traffic. Traffic Commanders exercise command and control of RMS resources at the outer perimeter with regard to traffic management such as the coordination of Traffic Emergency Patrols.  Traffic Emergency Patrols vans patrol major road routes and respond to unplanned incidents with the aim of returning the road to normal operating conditions as soon as possible.  Both Traffic Commanders and TEP units carry a wide array of traffic management devices such as traffic cones, barrier boards and road signage.  Both also are permitted to use and display red and blue emergency lighting and are designated as 'emergency vehicles'.

'Role of the TMC'
The current Memorandum of Understanding (MOU) between various Government agencies in NSW states that the TMC has the following responsibilities:

The TMC will:

Coordinate RMS/TNSW Traffic Commanders or appropriate resources to incidents on the road network.
Accept responsibility for traffic management from the incident inner perimeter or event perimeter into the rest of the road network.
Clear the road and make it safe.
Communicate traffic management arrangements to the media.
Assist in the timely provision of heavy lift and other towing/salvage services to clear the road.
Provide close support to the Site Controller for traffic control within an incident outer perimeter.
Develop and deploy Traffic Emergency Patrol (TEP) teams for specific routes.
Develop a joint framework and lead in the development of traffic management plans and incident response plans.
Coordinate the response of specialised resources to support traffic management.
At the request of Police or a Combat Agency, display warnings and alerts on the Variable Message Signs (VMS) in accordance with approved guidelines. This may include warnings associated with bushfires and floods.
Assist in the conduct of Green Light Corridors

Car ferry services

As part of its duty to provide major road infrastructure, RMS was responsible for the provision of several car ferries. These ferries are all toll-free, and include:

Berowra Waters Ferry, across Berowra Waters
Lawrence Ferry, across the Clarence River
Mortlake Ferry, across the Parramatta River in Sydney
Sackville Ferry, across the Hawkesbury River near the village of Sackville
Speewa Ferry, across the Murray River between New South Wales and Victoria
Ulmarra Ferry, across the Clarence River
Webbs Creek Ferry, across the Hawkesbury River in the village of Wisemans Ferry
Wisemans Ferry, across the Hawkesbury River in the village of Wisemans Ferry
Wymah Ferry, across the Murray River between New South Wales and Victoria

Lighthouses

RMS was responsible for light operation in the following 13 lighthouses:
Point Danger Lighthouse
Fingal Head Light
Ballina Head Light
Evans Head Light
Tacking Point Lighthouse
Crowdy Head Light
Point Stephens Light
Norah Head Light
Barrenjoey Head Lighthouse
Kiama Light
Warden Head Light
Brush Island Light
Burrewarra Point Light

Key building projects
At the time Roads and Maritime Services was dissolved on 1 December 2019, key road building projects that RMS were undertaking either directly, through contractors or via public/private partnerships, included:
On-going completion of a four-lane dual carriageway of the Princes Highway from the Jervis Bay turnoff to link up with the Sydney Orbital Network near Mascot
Pacific Highway Upgrade: On-going completion of the upgrading of the Pacific Highway to continuous dual carriageway (minimum four-lane) standard between the Hexham and Tweed Heads, by 2020.
WestConnex and Sydney Gateway, by 2023
NorthConnex, by 2020
Western Harbour Tunnel & Beaches Link, by 2026
Western Sydney Airport Motorway, by 2026

Offices
Previously Roads and Maritime Services maintained separate offices, which were the most widespread offices of the New South Wales Government in the state.  They have almost universally been replaced by Service NSW offices.  While the new offices perform most of the functions of Roads and Maritime Services, they also handle other New South Wales Government services, such as Births Deaths and Marriage registrations.

Many functions that formerly required personal attendance, such as vehicle registration renewal, can now be performed online.

See also

List of New South Wales government agencies

References

External links
Roads and Maritime Services website
SCATS - Sydney Coordinated Adaptive Traffic System Website

Further reading
Great Western Highway
Sydney to Melbourne strategy
Hume Highway duplication package
Coolac Bypass
Pacific Highway
Princes Highway strategy.

Government agencies established in 2011
Government agencies disestablished in 2019
Defunct government entities of New South Wales

Road authorities
Transport in New South Wales
State departments of transport of Australia
2011 establishments in Australia
2019 disestablishments in Australia